Princess Aditayadorn Kitikhun (born 5 May 1984), commonly known as Princess Dita, is the second daughter of Princess Chulabhorn Walailak and Virayudh Tishyasarin.

Education
Princess Aditayadorn Kitikhun received a Bachelor of Arts degree in Communication Design from Mahidol University International College on 4 July 2011. Her graduating thesis titled "Redesign Packaging for Royal Chitralada Agricultural Products" was displayed at the annual Media Arts Exhibition at Bangkok Art and Culture Centre hosted by the Fine and Applied Arts division during 2–5 August 2011.

On 21 November 2017 she received the Graduate Certificate in the Department of Agricultural Technology of Rajamangala University of Technology (RMUT).

Honours
 :
 Dame Grand Cross of the Order of Chula Chom Klao, First Class
 Dame Grand Cordon of the Order of the White Elephant
 Dame Grand Cordon of the Order of the Crown of Thailand
 Recipient of the Commemorative Medal on the Occasion of the Coronation of H.M. King Rama X
 Recipient of the  King Vajiralongkorn Royal Cypher Badge Medal

Ancestry

See also 
 King Bhumibol Adulyadej

Notes

References

External links
 Princess Adityadhornkitikhun

Thai female Phra Ong Chao
Aditayadorn Kitikhun
1984 births
Living people
Aditayadorn Kitikhun
Aditayadorn Kitikhun
Aditayadorn Kitikhun
20th-century Chakri dynasty
21st-century Chakri dynasty